Chris Bartlett (born March 29, 1966) is an American gay activist, feminist, educator, and researcher who lives in Philadelphia, PA, and is the Executive Director of the William Way Community Center.

Life and works
Bartlett grew up in Cheltenham Township, Pennsylvania  and  graduated with a Bachelor of Arts in Classics from Brown University in 1988 and a second Bachelor of Arts in Literae Humaniores from New College, Oxford in 1991.

He was director of the SafeGuards Gay Men's Health Project  in Philadelphia from 1991–2001, where he developed innovative programs addressing the broader health needs of gay and bisexual men beyond HIV and AIDS.

In his early research, he directed a survey of over 1400 gay and bisexual men in the Philadelphia region in order to assess their risk for HIV,  STDs and other health challenges.

In 2003,  Bartlett joined forces with gay activist Eric Rofes to create the Gay Men's Health Leadership Academy, a national center for excellence for leadership development of gay and bisexual men and their allies based at the White Crane Institute. The Academy hosts biannual retreats on the East Coast (Greenwich, NY) and the West Coast (Guerneville, CA) of the United States, and also works with organizations and governments to strengthen their cadres of gay leadership. Since Rofes' death, the program has been co-facilitated by Kevin Trimell Jones of Philadelphia, PA; Fred Lopez of San Francisco, CA; Scott Pegues of Denver, CO; and Kaijson Noilmar of Seattle, WA.

In 2005, under the leadership of Michael S. Hinson Jr., he directed the LGBT Community Assessment, an assessment of the broad health related needs of LGBT populations in the Philadelphia region. The City of Philadelphia and Philadelphia Foundation subsequently funded an LGBT Youth Assessment, which he also directed.

In 2008,  Bartlett received a grant from the Arcus Foundation to create the LGBT Leadership Initiative, a convening of thinkers in the United States about the strategic  leadership needs of LGBT communities in the United States.  His leadership interests include intergenerational communication and connection, as well as mentorship of younger leaders. In the November, 2008 Instinct Magazine he was named one of the "Leading Men of 2008."

He has created an on-line Wiki to document the deaths of gay men from AIDS between 1981 and the present. The site acts as an on-line AIDS quilt, on which community members  and families can document the lives of their friends and loved ones.

Bartlett is also a long-time leader in the Gay Men's Health Movement, both nationally and internationally.  He has participated in each of the Gay Men's Health Summits and LGBTI Health Summits as an organizer and presenter, as well as presenting at the Warning Gay Men's Health Summit in Paris, France, in 2005.

His work has shown a continuing interest in participatory democracy, starting with his early participation in ACT UP Philadelphia. His current work focuses on the role of social media, including Twitter, Facebook, and other tools in developing on-line communities that can participate in effective social change. Out of his engagement in social media work, he hosted the TEDx conferences in Philadelphia on November 18, 2010 and November 8, 2011.  In 2014, he presented his own TEDxPhilly talk, "How To Make the Neighborhood You Want", which shows the city planning lessons that Philadelphia's Chinatown has for its Gay neighborhood.

He is a member of the Philadelphia circle of Radical Faeries.

During his tenure at the William Way LGBT Community Center, he has focused on community building through arts and culture,  technological innovation, and intergenerational approaches.  He has been a leader in the effort to build housing that is friendly for LGBT seniors.  In 2013 under Bartlett's leadership the community center has received grants to fund the nation's first LGBT Jazz Festival (2014) and a city-wide exploration of LGBT history in Philadelphia (2015)

His writings include "Levity and Gravity", in  Mattilda Bernstein Sycamore's <Why are Faggots So Afraid of Faggots: Flaming Challenges To Masculinity, Objectification and the Desire to Conform>; and "Choosing Faerie" in  Mark Thompson's The Fire in Moonlight: Stories from the Radical Faeries: 1975-2010.

References

External links
Video of Chris Bartlett's 2017 talk on the importance of solidarity with African LGBTQ organizing
Video of Chris Bartlett's 2016 talk: "Queer Generation" at Washington College
Video of Chris Bartlett's 2014 TEDxPhilly talk: "How to Make the Neighborhood you Want."
WRTI's Meridee Duddleston interviews Chris Bartlett about Outbeat, the nation's first LGBT jazz festival.
Video of Chris Bartlett's talk on personal brand:  Being @harveymilk.  
Video of Chris Bartlett's presentation: Social Networks for the Dead
A short movie created for Chris Bartlett's 40th birthday by Peter Lien and Matty Hart
The Gay History Wiki
The Gay Men's Health Leadership Academy
 Chris Bartlett's writings for the Lifelube Blog

1966 births
Living people
American feminists
American LGBT rights activists
American health activists
American gay men
Brown University alumni
Alumni of New College, Oxford
Political activists from Pennsylvania
Activists from Philadelphia
Members of ACT UP
Radical Faeries members
Male feminists
People from Cheltenham, Pennsylvania
LGBT people from Pennsylvania
Gay feminists
21st-century American LGBT people